Spahić or Spahic/Spahich is a Bosnian and Croatian surname. It is derived from the Turkish term sipahi (from Persian: سپاهی (sepāhī) with the meaning "soldier") for a cavalryman by adding the Serbo-Croatian surname forming suffix -ić. 

There is a village in Croatia 15 km from Bosiljevo (Croatia) on the Kupa river which borders Slovenia called 
Spahići with a population of approximately 57.

In some cases within Bosnia and Herzegovina, those who bear the last name of Spahić are most likely to come from, or have relatives that inhabit the city/municipality of Zenica.

 People with the surname include:

 Aleksa Spahić (1899–1975), Croatian athlete
 Alisa Spahić (born 1990), Bosnian footballer
 Amir Spahić (born 1983), Bosnia and Herzegovina footballer
 Amira Spahić (born 1983), Bosnia and Herzegovina footballer
 Avdo Spahić (born 1997), Bosnian-German footballer
 Emir Spahić (born 1980), Bosnian former footballer
 Ibrahim Spahic (born 1952), Bosnia and Herzegovina politician
 Jasmin Spahić (born 1980), Bosnian former footballer
 Ognjen Spahić (born 1977), Montenegrin novelist

Bosnian surnames
Patronymic surnames